WRCW (1250 AM) is a conservative talk formatted broadcast radio station licensed to Warrenton, Virginia, serving Warrenton and Fauquier County, Virginia. The station power is 3,000 watts daytime, and 125 watts at night. WRCW is a full-time relay of sister station WWRC in Bethesda, Maryland.  WRCW is owned and operated by Salem Media Group.

History

WEER

WRCW's original call letters were WEER. In September 1957 the O.K. Broadcasting Company was issued a construction permit for a 500 watt, daytime-only station on 1250 AM in Warrenton, Virginia. WEER received its first license on January 18, 1958.

WPRZ
On January 26, 1982, the station's call letters were changed to WPRZ, for "Praise Radio", as the station adopted a Christian religious format. On September 30, 2007, WPRZ signed off after being sold to Metro Radio, Inc. on August 15, 2007 for $1.1 million. The Christian format was continued online-only for a time and now resides at WPRZ-FM (88.1 FM).

WKDL
On October 12, 2007, the call letters became WKDL, and the station adopted a Spanish language talk format. The WKDL call letters had been used in the mid-1990s at 1050 AM in Silver Spring,  Maryland (current WBQH), which at the time was co-owned with WKDV 1460 AM in Manassas, Virginia, with both stations affiliates of the children-oriented Radio AAHS network.

On May 21, 2008 the station switched to a classic country format. In mid-November, the country format was abruptly dropped for brokered programming.

From January 31, 2011, until February 2012, WKDL simulcast the talk format of WTNT (730 AM) in Alexandria, Virginia on a full-time basis. Its programming lineup consisted mostly of Talk Radio Network offerings, particularly America's Morning News, The Laura Ingraham Show,  America's Radio News Network, The Jerry Doyle Show, The Savage Nation, The Rusty Humphries Show and The Phil Hendrie Show.

WKDL was sold to Salem Communications in February 2012 for $10,000. This purchase was mainly so Salem could make engineering changes that would allow it to double the daytime power of WWRC (1260 AM, Washington, D.C.) to 10,000 watts. To make way for the improved WWRC signal, WKDL's daytime power was reduced from 5,000 watts to 3,000 watts, and a strong directional antenna was designed to send most of the station's signal southwestward, away from Washington D.C.

WRCW
On July 23, 2014, the station changed its call sign to WRCW. The station served as a southwestern relay of the conservative talk programming on WWRC. WRCW continued simulcasting WWRC when it moved to 570 AM in November 2017, ahead of Salem's sale of the 1260 AM facility (now WQOF).

References

External links
 570 The Answer Online

1957 establishments in Virginia
Talk radio stations in the United States
Radio stations established in 1957
RCW
Salem Media Group properties
 Conservative talk radio